Cobles may mean:
 Coble(s), traditional wooden Yorkshire fishing boats
 Cobleș, a river in Alba County, Romania
 Cobleș, a village in the commune Arieșeni, Alba County, Romania